Xi Yuanping (born November 1956) is the younger brother of the current Chinese Communist Party General Secretary, Xi Jinping. He is currently the president of the International Energy Conservation and Environmental Protection Association.

References 

Xi Jinping family
Living people
1956 births